Chuymani (Aymara chuyma heart or another organ, -ni a suffix, "the one with a heart", also spelled Chuimani) is a  mountain in the Bolivian Andes. It is located in the Cochabamba Department, Arque Province, Arque Municipality, northwest of Arque.

References 

Mountains of Cochabamba Department